Zack, Zac, or Zak is the name of a character in the original and new continuities of Battlestar Galactica.

Original Continuity
Zac is the youngest child, son, of Adama and Ila.  He was played by actor Rick Springfield.

New Continuity

Zak is the youngest child, son of William Adama and Caroline.

Battlestar Galactica characters